WIRY is an AM radio station licensed to Plattsburgh, New York. The locally owned and operated  radio station broadcasts at 1340 kHz in C-QUAM AM stereo into a Valcom whip antenna (one of the only stations to do so) with a full service variety format.

WIRY is primarily music-formatted, featuring an eclectic variety of formats. The station describes its format as a mix of adult contemporary, country music, and oldies.

WIRY is mostly locally operated. The station has a live local morning show and an extensive local news and sports bureau, carrying the Plattsburgh Cardinals hockey team in winter months and high school sports. The station also has several creative advertising programs, including a listing of lunch menus from advertisers and a radio help-wanted show titled "Who's Hiring." Weather forecasts are taken from public domain National Weather Service reports.

The station serves as an affiliate for the New York Yankees, New York Giants, Westwood One, The Beatle Years with Bob Malik, When Radio Was and The Country Music Greats Radio Show.

In addition, the station also streams on the Internet. It has streamed continuously since prior to 2002 and survived the Internet radio bust that forced many stations to stop streaming at that time.

WIRY began leasing FM radio station WPLB in 2016; the rechristened WIRY-FM would mostly simulcast the AM side, with syndicated music programs likely to air in place of sports (Bill Santa, WIRY's owner, stated that major sports teams prefer AM radio affiliates). WIRY ended the FM simulcast in 2020.

In September 2019, a coalition led by the station's news director Dave Andrews along with Clinton County businessmen and politicians was revealed to be in negotiations to purchase WIRY from Bill Santa. The station's full-service format is not expected to change. The purchase by Hometown Communications, LLC, at a price of $287,500, was consummated on December 27, 2019.

References

External links

IRY
Radio stations established in 1950
Full service radio stations in the United States
1950 establishments in New York (state)